Colombia competed at the 2013 World Aquatics Championships in Barcelona, Spain between 19 July and 4 August 2013.

Medalists

Diving

Colombia qualified 6 quota places for the following diving events.

Men

Women

High diving

Colombia qualified one quota places for the following high diving event.

Swimming

Colombian swimmers earned qualifying standards in the following events (up to a maximum of 2 swimmers in each event at the A-standard entry time, and 1 at the B-standard):

Men

Women

Synchronized swimming

Colombian synchronized swimmers earned qualifying standards in the following events.

References

External links
Federación Colombiana de Natación 
Barcelona 2013 Official Site

Nations at the 2013 World Aquatics Championships
2013
World Aquatics Championships